Middle Grove is an unincorporated community in Marion County, Oregon, United States.

References

Unincorporated communities in Marion County, Oregon
Unincorporated communities in Oregon